is an underground metro station located in Kanagawa-ku, Yokohama, Kanagawa Prefecture, Japan operated by the Yokohama Municipal Subway’s Blue Line (Line 3). It is 26.7 kilometers from the terminus of the Blue Line at Shōnandai Station.

History
Katakurachō Station was opened on March 14, 1985. Platform screen doors were installed in April 2007.

Lines
Yokohama Municipal Subway
Blue Line

Station layout
Katakurachō Station has a dual opposed side platforms serving two tracks, located four stories underground.

Platforms

References
 Harris, Ken and Clarke, Jackie. Jane's World Railways 2008-2009. Jane's Information Group (2008).

External links
 Katakurachō Station (Blue Line) 

Railway stations in Kanagawa Prefecture
Railway stations in Japan opened in 1985
Blue Line (Yokohama)